Serua may refer to:
Serua Island, an island in Indonesia
Serua language
Serua Province, a province in Fiji
Serua District
Serua (Fijian Communal Constituency, Fiji)
Šerua (Serua), a Mesopotamian goddess